A tubeworm is any worm-like sessile invertebrate that anchors its tail to an underwater surface and secretes around its body a mineral tube, into which it can withdraw its entire body.

Tubeworms are found among the following taxa:
 Annelida, the phylum containing segmented worms
 Polychaetea, the class containing bristle worms
 Canalipalpata, the order containing bristle-footed annelids or fan-head worms
 Siboglinidae, the family of beard worms
 Riftia pachyptila, a species known as giant tube worms
 Lamellibrachia, a genus
 Serpulidae, a family
 Sabellidae, the family containing feather duster worms
 Phoronida, the phylum containing horseshoe worms
 Microconchida, an order of extinct tubeworms
 Kuphus polythalamia , a bivalve mollusk species whose common name is giant tube worm

References

Sabellida
Phoronids
Serpulidae
Body plans